St. Viator College was a Catholic liberal arts college in Bourbonnais, Illinois. It is no longer in operation. Today, the site is home to Olivet Nazarene University.

History

St. Viator's grew out of the original Bourbonnais village school, founded in 1865 by the Viatorians, to an academy for boys with the help of Father P. Beaudoin and Brothers Martel and Bernard, and on 9/6/1868 to a four-year liberal arts college with the aid of Father Thomas Roy. After nine years of work, Father Roy returned to his home in Canada, and was succeeded by Father M. J. Marsile, who oversaw the college for another 25 years. In 1906, several buildings were destroyed by fire, but courses continued in improvised quarters and new buildings were erected. Father Marsile afterward resigned, and Reverend John Patrick O'Mahoney C.S.V. was appointed president. Under financial pressure, it closed in 1939.

Campus
Roy Memorial Chapel was named for Father Thomas Roy, who served as president of the college. Marsile Alumni Hall was named in honour of Father M. J. Marsile, who was college president for 25 years. After St. Viator's closed in 1938, the campus was purchased by Olivet Nazarene College from Olivet, Illinois. Four buildings on the Olivet Nazarene campus are original from the days of St. Viator's 39-acre campus.

Academics
St. Viator College had a preparatory department and high school in addition to the college and seminary and, for most of its years, had an enrollment of over 300 students.

Student life
During its existence, St. Viator was the host of the Catholic State Basketball Tournament for Illinois. St. Viator College was a member of the Illinois Intercollegiate Athletic Conference from 1916 to 1938.

Notable persons
Many of the college's graduates were priests, but even more entered the professions of law and medicine. Notable alumni included John Tracy Ellis, Sam J. McAllister, Fulton J. Sheen, G. Raymond Sprague, Bernard James Sheil. and Joseph James Smith, youngest son of the notorious gangster and con artist "Soapy" Smith. Graduates entering the entertainment field include Jack Berch, popular singer and personality on four networks during the Golden Age of Radio.

See also
Clerics of St. Viator
 Johnson, Vic and the Bourbonnais Grove Historical Society. 2006. Bourbonnais, Charleston, SC: Arcadia Pub.

References

External links

 "PREPAREDNESS IN CATHOLIC SCHOOLS" by JOSEPH F. SMITH. New York Times, August 26, 1917, Sunday. Section: Instruction, Page 68, 1338 words

 
Defunct Christian universities and colleges
Educational institutions established in 1865
Defunct private universities and colleges in Illinois
Educational institutions disestablished in 1939
Former Catholic universities and colleges in the United States
Burned buildings and structures in the United States
1865 establishments in Illinois
1939 disestablishments in Illinois
Catholic universities and colleges in Illinois
Education in Kankakee County, Illinois